Gaius Suetonius Tranquillus, commonly referred to as Suetonius (c. AD 69 – after AD 122), was a Roman historian who wrote during the early Imperial era of the Roman Empire. His most important surviving work is a set of biographies of 12 successive Roman rulers, from Julius Caesar to Domitian, properly titled De vita Caesarum. Other works by Suetonius concerned the daily life of Rome, politics, oratory, and the lives of famous writers, including poets, historians, and grammarians. A few of these books have partially survived, but many have been lost.

Life
Gaius Suetonius Tranquillus was probably born about AD 69, a date deduced from his remarks describing himself as a "young man" 20 years after Nero's death. His place of birth is disputed, but most scholars place it in Hippo Regius, a small north African town in Numidia, in modern-day Algeria. It is certain that Suetonius came from a family of moderate social position, that his father, Suetonius Laetus, was a tribune belonging to the equestrian order (tribunus angusticlavius) in Legio XIII Gemina, and that Suetonius was educated when schools of rhetoric flourished in Rome.

Suetonius was a close friend of senator and letter-writer Pliny the Younger. Pliny describes him as "quiet and studious, a man dedicated to writing". Pliny helped him buy a small property and interceded with the Emperor Trajan to grant Suetonius immunities usually granted to a father of three, the ius trium liberorum, because his marriage was childless. Through Pliny, Suetonius came into favour with Trajan and Hadrian. Suetonius may have served on Pliny's staff when Pliny was imperial governor (legatus Augusti pro praetore) of Bithynia and Pontus (northern Asia Minor) between 110 and 112. Under Trajan he served as secretary of studies (precise functions are uncertain) and director of Imperial archives. Under Hadrian, he became the emperor's secretary. Hadrian later dismissed Suetonius for his alleged affair with the empress Vibia Sabina.

Works

The Twelve Caesars

Suetonius is mainly remembered as the author of De Vita Caesarum—translated as The Life of the Caesars, although a more common English title is The Lives of the Twelve Caesars or simply The Twelve Caesars—his only extant work except for the brief biographies and other fragments noted below. The Twelve Caesars, probably written in Hadrian's time, is a collective biography of the Roman Empire's first leaders, Julius Caesar (the first few chapters are missing), Augustus, Tiberius, Caligula, Claudius, Nero, Galba, Otho, Vitellius, Vespasian, Titus and Domitian. The book was dedicated to his friend Gaius Septicius Clarus, a prefect of the Praetorian Guard in 119. The work tells the tale of each Caesar's life according to a set formula: the descriptions of appearance, omens, family history, quotes, and then a history are given in a consistent order. He recorded the earliest accounts of Julius Caesar's epileptic seizures.

Other works

Partly extant
De Viris Illustribus ("On Famous Men" — in the field of literature), to which belong:
De Illustribus Grammaticis ("Lives of the Grammarians"; 20 brief lives, apparently complete)
De Claris Rhetoribus ("Lives of the Rhetoricians"; 5 brief lives out of an original 16 survive)
De Poetis ("Lives of the Poets"; the life of Virgil, as well as fragments from the lives of Terence, Horace and Lucan, survive)
De Historicis ("Lives of the historians"; a brief life of Pliny the Elder is attributed to this work)
Peri ton par' Hellesi paidion ("Greek Games")
Peri blasphemion ("Greek Terms of Abuse")
The two last works were written in Greek. They apparently survive in part in the form of extracts in later Greek glossaries.

Lost works
The following list of Suetonius's lost works is from Robert Graves's foreword to his translation of the Twelve Caesars.
Royal Biographies
Lives of Famous Whores
Roman Manners and Customs
The Roman Year
The Roman Festivals
Roman Dress
Greek Games
Offices of State
On Cicero’s Republic
Physical Defects of Mankind
Methods of Reckoning Time
An Essay on Nature
Greek Objurations
Grammatical Problems
Critical Signs Used in Books

The introduction to the Loeb edition of Suetonius, translated by J. C. Rolfe, with an introduction by  K. R. Bradley, references the Suda with the following titles:
On Greek games
On Roman spectacles and games
On the Roman year
On critical signs in books
On Cicero's Republic
On names and types of clothes
On insults
On Rome and its customs and manners

The volume adds other titles not testified within the Suda.
On famous courtesans
On kings
On the institution of offices
On physical defects
On weather signs
On names of seas and rivers
On names of winds

Two other titles may also be collections of some of the aforelisted:

Pratum (Miscellany)
On various matters

Editions
 Edwards, Catherine Lives of the Caesars. Oxford World's Classics. (Oxford University Press, 2008). 
 Robert Graves (trans.), Suetonius: The Twelve Caesars (Harmondsworth, Middlesex, England: Penguin Books, Ltd, 1957) 
 Donna W. Hurley (trans.), Suetonius: The Caesars (Indianapolis/London: Hackett Publishing Company, 2011).
 J.C. Rolfe (trans.), Lives of the Caesars, Volume I (Loeb Classical Library 31, Harvard University Press, 1997).
 J.C. Rolfe (trans.), Lives of the Caesars, Volume II (Loeb Classical Library 38, Harvard University Press, 1998).
 C. Suetonii Tranquilli De vita Caesarum libros VIII et De grammaticis et rhetoribus librum, ed. Robert A. Kaster (Oxford: 2016).

See also
 Suetonius on Christians

Notes

References
 Barry Baldwin, Suetonius: Biographer of the Caesars. Amsterdam: A. M. Hakkert, 1983.
 Gladhill, Bill. “The Emperor's No Clothes: Suetonius and the Dynamics of Corporeal Ecphrasis.” Classical Antiquity, vol. 31, no. 2, 2012, pp. 315–348.
 Lounsbury, Richard C. The Arts of Suetonius: An Introduction. Frankfurt: Lang, 1987.
 Mitchell, Jack “Literary Quotation as Literary Performance in Suetonius.” The Classical Journal, vol. 110, no. 3, 2015, pp. 333–355
 Newbold, R.F. “Non-Verbal Communication in Suetonius and ‘The Historia Augusta:' Power, Posture and Proxemics.” Acta Classica, vol. 43, 2000, pp. 101–118.
 Power, Tristan, Collected Papers on Suetonius. Abingdon: Routledge, 2021.
 Power, Tristan and Roy K. Gibson (ed.), Suetonius, the Biographer: Studies in Roman Lives. Oxford; New York:   Oxford University Press, 2014
 Syme, Ronald. "The Travels of Suetonius Tranquillus." Hermes 109:105–117, 1981. 
 Trentin, Lisa. “Deformity in the Roman Imperial Court.” Greece & Rome, vol. 58, no. 2, 2011, pp. 195–208. 
 Trevor, Luke “Ideology and Humor in Suetonius' ‘Life of Vespasian’ 8.” The Classical World, vol. 103, no. 4, 2010, pp. 511–527.
 Wallace-Hadrill, Andrew F. Suetonius: The Scholar and his Caesars. New Haven, CT: Yale Univ. Press, 1983.
 Wardle, David. "Did Suetonius Write in Greek?" Acta Classica 36:91–103, 1993.
 Wardle, David. “Suetonius on Augustus as God and Man.” The Classical Quarterly, vol. 62, no. 1, 2012, pp. 307–326.
 Kaster, Robert A., Studies on the Text of Suetonius’ “De vita Caesarum” (Oxford: 2016).

External links

The Lives of the Twelve Caesars at LacusCurtius (Latin original, English translation)
 Suetonius' works at Latin Library (Latin)
 
 
 
 
 Gai Suetoni Tranquilli De vita Caesarum libri III-VI Cornell University Library Historical Monographs Collection.
 Lewis E 195 Vitae XII caesarium (Lives of the twelve caesars), fragment and Book of Hours leaf at OPenn
Livius.org: Suetonius

69 births
2nd-century deaths
Roman-era biographers
2nd-century historians
Latin historians
Silver Age Latin writers
2nd-century Romans
Ancient Roman equites
Suetonii
1st-century Romans